Glass typically has a tensile strength of . However, the theoretical upper bound on its strength is orders of magnitude higher: . This high value is due to the strong chemical Si–O bonds of silicon dioxide. Imperfections of the glass,  such as bubbles, and in particular surface flaws, such as scratches, have a great effect on the strength of glass and decrease it even more than for other brittle materials. The chemical composition of the glass also impacts its tensile strength. The processes of thermal and chemical toughening can increase the tensile strength of glass.

Strength of glass fiber 
Glass fibers have a much higher tensile strength than regular glass (200-500 times stronger than regular glass). This is due to the reduction of flaws in glass fibers and that glass fibers have a small cross sectional area, constraining maximum defect size (Size effect on structural strength).

Strength of fiberglass 
Fiberglass's strength depends on the type.

Hardness 
Glass has a hardness of 6.5 on the Mohs scale of mineral hardness.

References 

Glass physics